On 7 January 1989, Emperor Shōwa, the 124th Emperor of Japan according to the traditional order of succession, died in his sleep at 6:33 am JST after suffering from intestinal cancer for some time. He was 87 years old. The late emperor's state funeral was held on 24 February, when he was buried near his parents at the Musashi Imperial Graveyard in Hachiōji, Tokyo.

Illness and death
On 22 September 1987, the Emperor underwent surgery on his pancreas after having digestive problems for several months. The doctors discovered that he had duodenal cancer. The Emperor appeared to be making a full recovery for several months after the surgery. About a year later, however, on 19 September 1988, he collapsed in his palace, and his health worsened over the next several months as he suffered from continuous internal bleeding.

On 7 January 1989, at 7:55 am, the Grand Steward of Japan's Imperial Household Agency, Shōichi Fujimori, officially announced the death of Emperor Shōwa at 6:33 am, and revealed details about his cancer for the first time. He was survived by his wife, five children, ten grandchildren and one great-grandchild.

Succession and posthumous title

Emperor Shōwa's death ended the Shōwa era. He was succeeded by his son, Crown Prince Akihito. With Emperor Akihito's accession, a new era began: the Heisei era, effective at midnight the day after Emperor Shōwa's death. The new Emperor's formal enthronement ceremony was held in Tokyo on 12 November 1990.

The late Emperor's definitive posthumous name, was officially determined on 13 January and formally released on 31 January by Noboru Takeshita, the Prime Minister.

State funeral
On Friday, 24 February Emperor Shōwa's state funeral was held, and unlike that of his predecessor, although formal it was not conducted in a strictly Shinto manner. It was a funeral carefully designed both as a tribute to the late Emperor and as a showcase for the peaceful, affluent society into which Japan had developed during his reign.

Unlike Emperor Taishō's funeral 62 years earlier, there was no ceremonious parade of officials dressed in military uniforms, and there were far fewer of the Shinto rituals used at that time to glorify the Emperor as a near-deity. These changes were meant to highlight that the Emperor Shōwa's funeral would be the first of an emperor under the postwar democratic Constitution, and the first imperial funeral held in daylight.
 
The delay of 48 days between his death and the funeral was about the same as that for the previous Emperor, and allowed time for numerous ceremonies leading up to the funeral. The late Emperor's body lay in three coffins; some personal items such as books and stationery were also placed into them.

Ceremony at the Imperial Palace
The ceremonies began at 7:30 a.m. when Emperor Akihito conducted a private Ceremony of Farewell for his father in the Imperial Palace.

Funeral procession through Tokyo 
At 9:35 a.m., a black motor hearse carrying the body of Emperor Shōwa left the Imperial Palace for the two-mile-long drive to the Shinjuku Gyoen Garden, where the Shinto and state ceremonies were held. A brass band played a dirge composed for the funeral of Emperor Shōwa's great-grandmother in the late 19th century, and cannon shots were fired in accompaniment.

The motor hearse was accompanied by a procession of 60 cars. The route of the cortege through Tokyo was lined by an estimated 800,000 spectators and 32,000 special police, who had been mobilized to guard against potential terrorist attacks.

The path of the funeral procession passed the National Diet, the democratic core of modern Japan, and the National Stadium, where the emperor opened the 1964 Summer Olympics and heralded Japan's postwar re-emergence.

Ceremonies at Shinjuku Gyoen Garden
The 40-minute procession, accompanied by a brass band, ended when it pulled into the Shinjuku Gyoen Garden, until 1949 reserved for the use of the Imperial family and now one of Tokyo's most popular parks.

At the Shinjuku Gyoen Garden, the funeral ceremonies for Emperor Shōwa were conducted in a Sojoden, a specially constructed funeral hall. The funeral hall was constructed of Japanese cypress and held together with bamboo nails, in keeping with ancient imperial tradition.

The official guests were seated in two white tents located in front of the funeral hall. Because of the low temperatures, many guests used chemical hand-warmers and wool blankets to keep warm as the three-hour Shinto and state ceremonies progressed.

Palanquin procession
Emperor Shōwa's coffin was transferred into a palanquin made of cypress wood painted with black lacquer. Attendants wearing  and bearing white and yellow banners, shields and signs of the sun and moon, led a 225-member procession as musicians played traditional court music. Next came gray-robed attendants carrying two sacred  trees draped with cloth streamers and ceremonial boxes of food and silk cloths to be offered to the spirit of the late Emperor.

In a nine-minute procession, 51 members of the Imperial Household Agency, clad in traditional gray Shinto clothing, carried the 1.5 ton  (Imperial Palanquin) containing the three-layered coffin of the Emperor Shōwa into the funeral hall, as they walked up the aisle between the white tents with domestic and foreign dignitaries.

Behind the coffin walked a chamberlain dressed in white, who carried a platter with a pair of white shoes, as it is traditionally held that the deceased Emperor would wear them to heaven. The new Emperor, Akihito, and the Empress Michiko, carrying their own large umbrellas, followed the palanquin with other family members.

The procession passed through a small wooden  gate, the Shinto symbol marking the entrance to sacred space, and filed into the Sojoden.

Shinto ceremony
The events in the Sojoden were divided into a religious  ceremony, followed by the state  ceremony.

When the procession entered the funeral hall, the Shinto portion of the funeral began and a black curtain partition was drawn closed. It opened to reveal a centuries-old ceremony. To the accompaniment of chanting, officials approached the altar of the Emperor, holding aloft wooden trays of sea bream, wild birds, kelp, seaweed, mountain potatoes, melons and other delicacies. The foods, as well as silk cloths, were offered to the spirit of the late Emperor.

The chief of ceremony, a childhood classmate and attendant of Emperor Shōwa, then delivered an address, followed by Emperor Akihito.

The funeral continued as the black curtain closed, signalling the end of the Shinto portion of the funeral.

State ceremony
As the curtain parted again, Japan's Chief Cabinet Secretary opened the state portion of the funeral. At noon, he called for a minute of silence throughout Japan. Prime Minister Takeshita delivered a short eulogy, in which he said that the reign of the late emperor would be remembered for its eventful and tumultuous times, including the Second World War and the eventual reconstruction of Japan. Foreign dignitaries approached the altar one at a time to pay their respects.

Ceremony at the Imperial Graveyard

Following the state ceremony, the Emperor Shōwa's coffin was taken to the Musashi Imperial Graveyard in the Hachiōji district of Tokyo for burial. At Emperor Taishō's funeral in 1927, the trip to the Musashi Imperial Graveyard was carried out as a 3-hour procession, but at the Emperor Shōwa's funeral, the trip was made by motor hearse and cut to 40 minutes. Several hours of ceremonies followed there, until the late emperor was laid to rest at nightfall, the traditional time to bury emperors.

Visitors and guests

Summary
An estimated 200,000 people lined the site of the procession – far fewer than the 860,000 that officials had projected. The Emperor Shōwa's funeral was attended by some 10,000 official guests. A total of 163 countries (out of 166 at that time) and 27 international organizations sent representatives to the event. More than 70 world leaders attended the funeral of the Emperor.

In total, there were 53 heads of state, 15 heads of government, 19 deputy heads of state, 17 members of royal families, 43 foreign ministers and other officials present, all of which required placing Tokyo under an unprecedented blanket of security. Because of security concerns for the dignitaries and because of threats from Japanese left-wing extremists to disrupt the funeral, authorities decided to scrap many of the traditional events that normally accompany funerals for Japanese monarchs. Officials also overrode protocol to give US president Bush a front-row seat, even though tradition would have put him toward the back, at the fifty fifth seat, because of his short time in office. Bush, who arrived in Tokyo on Thursday afternoon, attended the funeral on Friday afternoon and departed for China on Saturday.

Japanese officials said it was the biggest funeral in modern Japanese history, and the unprecedented turnout of world leaders was recognition of Japan's emergence as an economic superpower. The Emperor Shōwa was the longest-reigning emperor in Japanese history and the last of the major leaders from World War II. Many also viewed the burial of the emperor as the nation's final break with a militaristic past that plunged much of Asia into war in the 1930s. The late emperor's wife, the Empress Dowager Nagako, did not attend the ceremonies due to a lingering back and leg malady.

The event hold records for the largest gathering of international leaders in world history at that time for a state funeral, surpassed the funeral of Josip Broz Tito in 1980. It would stand for the next 16 years until Pope John Paul II's funeral in 2005.

Foreign dignitaries
The foreign dignitaries who attended the funeral:

Members of royal houses 
 Sheikh Ali bin Khalifa Al Khalifa (representing the Emir of Bahrain)
 The King of the Belgians
 The King of Bhutan
 The Sultan of Brunei
 The Prince Consort of Denmark (representing the Queen of Denmark)
 The King of Jordan
 Tuanku Muhriz, prince of the Negeri Sembilan royal family
 The King of Lesotho
 The Crown Prince of Morocco (representing the King of Morocco)
 The Queen of the Netherlands
 The Crown Prince of Norway (representing the King of Norway)
 The Sultan of Oman
 The King and Queen of Spain
 The King and Queen of Sweden 
 The Crown Prince of Thailand (representing the King of Thailand)
 The King and Queen of Tonga
 The Duke of Edinburgh (representing the Queen of the United Kingdom)

Head of State 
 President of Argentina Raul Alfonsin
 President of Bangladesh Hussain Muhammad Ershad
 President of Brazil Jose Sarney
 President Pierre Buyoya
 President of Comoros Salim Ben Ali
 President of Cyprus George Vassiliou
 President of Egypt Hosni Mubarak
 President of Fiji Penaia Ganilau
 President of Finland Mauno Koivisto
 President of France François Mitterrand
 President of Ghana Jerry Rawlings
 President of Greece Christos Sartzetakis
 President of the Council of State Joao Bernardo Vieira
 President of Honduras José Azcona del Hoyo
 President of Hungary Brunó Ferenc Straub
 President of Iceland Vigdis Finnbogadottir
 President of India Ramaswamy Venkataraman
 President of Indonesia Suharto
 President of Ireland Patrick J. Hillery
 President of Israel Chaim Herzog
 President of Italy Francesco Cossiga
 President of Kenya Daniel arap Moi
 President of Maldives Maumoon Abdul Gayoom
 President of Mongolia Jambyn Batmönkh
 President of Nigeria Ibrahim Babangida
 President of Palestine Yasser Arafat
 President of the Philippines Corazon Aquino
 President of Portugal Mário Soares
 President of Sri Lanka Ranasinghe Premadasa 
 President of Syria Hafez al-Assad
 President of Togo Gnassingbe Eyadema
 President of Uganda Yoweri Museveni
 President of the United States George H. W. Bush
 President of Vanuatu Fred Timakata
 President of West Germany Richard von Weizsäcker
 President of Zaire Mobutu Sese Seko
 President of Zambia Kenneth Kaunda
 President of Zimbabwe Robert Mugabe

Prime Minister/Vice-President
 Prime Minister Wilfried Martens
 Vice-President of Council of Ministers and Minister of Education José Ramón 
 Prime Minister of Djibouti Barkat Gourad Hamadou
 Vice-President Carlos Morales Troncoso
 Prime Minister Fikre-Selassie Wogderess
 First Vice-President and Prime Minister Hamilton Green
 Vice President of Iran Mostafa Mir-Salim
 Vice President of Iraq Taha Muhie-eldin Marouf
 Vice-President Teatao Teannaki
 Vice President of Laos Phoun Sipaseut
 Vice-President Harry F. Moniba
 Prime Minister Mamane Oumarou
 Prime Minister of Pakistan Benazir Bhutto
 Vice President of Poland Kazimierz Barcikowski
 Prime Minister of Singapore Lee Kuan Yew
 Prime Minister of South Korea Kang Young Hoon
 Prime Minister Felipe Gonzalez
 Prime Minister Sotsha E. Dlamini
 Prime Minister Carl Bildt
 Prime Minister and First Vice President Joseph Sinde Warioba
 Prime Minister of Tunisia Hedi Baccouche
 Prime Minister of Turkey Turgut Ozal
 Prime Minister Margaret Thatcher
 Vice President of the Presidency of Yugoslavia Stane Dolanc

Minister/International Represents of Foreign Affairs
 Minister of External Relations Pedro de Castro Van Dunen
 Minister of External Relations Leo Tindemans
 Deputy Vice-Minister of Ministry of Foreign Affairs Mary Carrasco Monje
 Minister of External Affairs Gaositwe K.T. Chiepe
 Minister of External Relations Roberto de Abreu Sodre
 Minister of External Relations Jean Marc Palm
 Minister of Foreign Affairs Silvino Manuel Da Luz
 Minister of Foreign Affairs Michel Gbezera-Bria
 Minister of Foreign Affairs Hernan Felipe Errazuriz
 Minister of Foreign Affairs of the People's Republic of China Qian Qichen
 Deputy Minister for Foreign Relations Esther Lozano de Ray
 Minister of Foreign Affairs, Cooperation and Trade Said Kafe
 Minister of Foreign Affairs and Worship Rodrigo Madrigal Nieto
 Minister of Foreign Affairs Ricardo Acevedo Peralta
 Minister of Foreign Affairs Roland Dumas
 Minister of External Affairs Alhaji Omar B. Sey
 Minister of Foreign Affairs The Chief of Battalion Jean Traore
 Deputy Minister for Foreign Affairs Gabor Nagy
 Minister of External Affairs P.V. Narasimha Rao
 Deputy Minister of Foreign Affairs Wisam Al-Zahawi
 Under-Secretary of State for Foreign Affairs Gilberto Bonalumi
 Vice-Chairman of the Council of Ministers and Minister of Foreign Affairs Phoune Sipaseuth
 Vice-Minister of Foreign Affairs Soubanh Srithirath
 Secretary of State for Foreign Affairs Robert Goebbels
 Minister of Foreign Affairs Jean Bemananjara
 Minister of Foreign Affairs Dato' Abu Hassan bin Haji Omar
 Minister of Foreign Affairs Fathulla Jameel
 Private Secretary to the Minister of Foreign Affairs Adrian Camilleri
 Minister of Foreign Affairs Torn Kijiner
 Minister of Foreign Affairs and Cooperation Mohamed Sidina Ould Sidiya
 Minister of Foreign Affairs and Cooperation Abdellatif Filali
 Minister of External Affairs Ike Nwachukwu
 Minister of Foreign Affairs Thorvald Stoltenberg
 Minister of Foreign Affairs Jorge Eduardo Ritter
 Minister of External Affairs Luis Maria Argana
 Minister of Foreign Affairs and Cooperation Antoine Ndinga-Oba
 Deputy Director of the Fourth Direction of the Ministry of Foreign Affairs Ioan Gorita
 Deputy Minister for Foreign Affairs Abdulrahman Mansouri
 Minister of Foreign Affairs Ibrahima Fall
 Minister of Foreign Affairs Abdul Karim Koroma
 Deputy Minister for Foreign Affairs Rogachev Igorj Alekseevich
 Secretary of State James A. Baker III
 Minister of Foreign Affairs Enrique Tejera Paris

Ambassador
 Ambassador Justin Papajorgji
 Ambassador Noureddine Yazid Zerhouni
 Ambassadress and Director of Asia and Oceania Department, Ministry of External Relations Maria de Jesus Haller
 Ambassador Hedayetul Huq
 Ambassador Patrick Nothomb 
 Ambassador Atlay Digby Morales
 Ambassador Dasho Karma Letho
 Ambassador Arnold Hofman-Bang Soleto
 Ambassador Carlos Antonio Bettencourt Bueno
 Ambassador Pengiran Dato Paduka Haji Idriss
 wife of Ambassador Peter Bashikarov
 Ambassador Hama Arba Diallo
 Ambassador Ba Thwin
 Ambassador Etienne Ntsama
 Ambassador Barry Connell Steers
 Ambassador Issa Abbas Ali
 Ambassador Gustavo Ponce Lerou
 Ambassador Yang Zhenya
 Ambassador Fidel Duque Ramirez
 Ambassador Amadeo Blanco Valdes-Fauly
 Ambassador Rudolf Jakubik
 Ambassador William Thune Andersen
 Ambassador Rachad Ahmed Saleh Farah
 Ambassador Alfonso Canto Dinzey
 Ambassador Manfred Schmidt
 Ambassador Marcelo Avila Orejuela
 Ambassador Wahib Fahmy El-Miniawy
 Ambassador Ernesto Arrieta Peralta
 Ambassador Worku Moges
 Ambassador Charles Walker
 Ambassador Pauli S. Opas
 Ambassador Bernard Dorin
 Ambassador James Leslie Mayne Amissah
 Ambassador George Lianis
 Ambassador El Hadj Boubacar Barry
 Ambassador Anibal Enrique Quinomez Abarca
 Ambassador Andras Forgacs
 Ambassador Arjun Gobindram Asrani
 Ambassador Seyed Mohammad Hossein Adeli
 Ambassador Rashid M.S. Al-Rifai
 Ambassador Sean G. Ronan
 Ambassador Nahum Eshkol
 Ambassador Bartolomeo Attolico
 Ambassador Pierre Nelson Coffi
 Ambassador Khaled Madadha
 Ambassador Abdul-Aziz Abdullatif Al-Sharekh
 Ambassador Souphanthaheuangsi Sisaleumsak
 Ambassador Amir El-Khoury
 Ambassador T.B. Moeketsi
 Ambassador Stephen J. Koffa
 Ambassador Jean-Louis Wolzfeld
 Ambassador Hubert Maxime Rajaobelina
 Ambassador Dato' J.A. Kamil
 Ambassador Abdoulaye Amadou Sy
 Ambassador J. Gauci
 Ambassador Taki Ould Sidi
 Ambassador-Director of the Asia and Middle East Department, Ministry of Foreign Affairs and Cooperation Moctar Ould Haye
 Ambassador Buyantyn. Dashtseren
 Ambassador Abdelaziz Benjelloun
 Ambassador Lopes Tembe Ndelana
 Ambassador Narayan Prasad Arjal
 Ambassador Herman Ch. Posthumus Meyjes
 Ambassador Rodney James Gates
 Ambassador Jorge Huezo Castrillo
 Ambassador Mai-Bukar Garba Dogon-Yaro
 Ambassador Hakon W. Freihow
 Ambassador Dawood bin Hamdan bin Abdulla Al-Hamdan,
 Ambassador Mansur Ahmad
 Ambassador Alberto A. Calvo Ponce
 Ambassador Joseph Kaal Nombri
 Ambassador Juan Carlos Hrase Von Bargen
 Ambassador Luis J. Macchiavello Amoros
 Ambassador Ramon V. del Rosario
 Ambassador Ryszard Frackiewicz
 Ambassador Jose Eduardo Mello Gouveia
 Ambassador Mohammed Ali Al-Ansari
 Ambassador Constantin Vlad
 Ambassador Joseph Nizeyimana
 Ambassador Manlio Cadelo
 Ambassador Fawzi Bin Abdul Majeed Shobokshi
 Ambassador Keba Birane Cisse
 Ambassador Sheku Badara Basiru Dumbuya
 Ambassador Cheng Tong Fatt
 Ambassador Hassan Abshir Farah
 Ambassador Lee Won-Kyung
 Ambassador Solovjev Nikolai Nikolaevich
 Ambassador Camilo Barcia Garcia-Villamil
 Ambassador Karunasena Kodituwakku
 Ambassador Mohammed Abdel Dayim Basheer
 Ambassador to the Netherlands Cyrill Ramkisoor
 Ambassador Ove F. Heyman
 Ambassador Roger Bar
 Ambassador Ali Said Mchumo
 Ambassador Birabhongse Kasemsri
 Ambassador Yao Bloua Agbo
 Ambassador to India Premchand J. Dass
 Ambassador Abdelhamid Ben Messaouda, Ambassador
 Ambassador Umut Arik
 Ambassador William Wycliffe Rwetsiba
 Ambassador Hamad Salem Al-Maqami
 Ambassador John Whitehead and Lady Whitehead
 Ambassador Alfredo Giro Pintos
 Ambassador Fernando Baez-Duarte
 Ambassador Vo Van Sung
 Ambassador Hans-Joachim Hallier
 Ambassador Mohamed Abdul Koddos Alwazir
 Ambassador Tarik Ajanovic
 Ambassador Murairi Mitima Kaneno
 Ambassador Boniface Salimu Zulu

Representatives
 Representative of Saint Vincent and the Grenadines
 Personal Representative of the President Bukarii Mahamadu Gabriel
 Personal Representative Prince Norodom Ranariddh
 Vice-President of Council of Ministers and Minister of Education José Ramón
 Represented by the Representative of Saint Vincent and the Grenadines
 Personal Representative of the President Ali Ben Bongo
 Represented by the Representative of Saint Vincent and the Grenadines
 Personal Representative of H.M. the Sultan Sayyid Thuwaini bin Shihab Al-Busaidi
 Represented by the Representative of Saint Vincent and the Grenadines
 Represented by the Representative of Saint Vincent and the Grenadines
 Personal Secretary for the Federal Councillor Pierre Combernous

Pardons
To mark the funeral, the government pardoned 30,000 people convicted of minor criminal offenses. The pardons also allowed an additional 11 million people to recover such civil rights as the right to vote and run for public office, which they had lost as a punishment for offenses.

Protests
The late emperor's funeral, like the man it honored, was dogged by bitter memories of the past. Many Allied veterans of World War II regarded Emperor Shōwa as a war criminal and called upon their countries to boycott the funeral. Nevertheless, of the 166 foreign states invited to send representatives, all but three accepted. Some Japanese, including a small Christian community, constitutional scholars and opposition politicians, denounced the pomp at the funeral as a return to past exaltation of the emperor and contended that the inclusion of Shinto rites violated Japan's post-war separation of church and state. Some groups, opposed to the Japanese monarchy, also staged small protests.

The Shinto rites, witnessed by official funeral guests and held at the same site as the state-sponsored portion of the funeral, prompted criticism that the Government was violating the constitutional separation of state and religion. This separation is especially important in Japan because Shinto was used as the religious basis for the ultra-nationalism and militaristic expansion of wartime Japan. Some opposition party delegates to the funeral boycotted that part of the ceremony. During the funeral procession in Tokyo, a man stepped into the street as the cortege approached. He was quickly apprehended by police who hustled him away.  At 1:55 pm, half an hour before the hearse carrying the late emperor's casket passed by, policemen patrolling the highway leading to the Musashi Imperial Graveyard heard an explosion and found debris scattered along the highway. They quickly cleared away the rubble, and the hearse passed without incident. In total, the police also arrested four people, two for trying to disrupt the procession.

See also
 Chrysanthemum taboo

References

External links

1989 in Japan
January 1989 events in Asia
February 1989 events in Asia
Hirohito
Hirohito
Hirohito
Hirohito
Japanese monarchy
Empire of Japan
Death and state funeral